Clare Valley Aerodrome is an airport located  north of the town of Clare, South Australia. The Clare Valley Flying Group began construction of the airfield in 2010 and it was officially opened in November 2014.

References

Airports in South Australia